Hole in the Wall may refer to:

Colloquial use 
In American English, an inconspicuous or unpretentious restaurant or retailer.
In British English, an automated teller machine.
The Hole In The Wall, a popular name for a public house.

Places
 Hole-in-the-Wall, a geologic formation and campground in Mojave National Preserve, California, USA
Hole-in-the-Wall, Eastern Cape, a geologic formation just off the coast in South Africa's Wild Coast Region
Hole-in-the-Wall, Herefordshire, England
Hole-in-the-Wall, Seaham Harbour, County Durham, England
Hole in the Wall Provincial Park, British Columbia, Canada
 The "Hole in the Wall", a prominent natural cave on the side of Mount Cory, in Banff National Park, Canada
Hole-in-the-Wall, a hideout in Wyoming used by the Hole in the Wall Gang
Hole-in-the-Wall (saloon), a saloon in New York City in the 19th century
 Hole-in-the-Wall, a geologic formation on Grand Manan Island, New Brunswick, Canada
 Hole-in-the-Wall, a geologic formation at Rialto Beach in Olympic National Park, Washington, USA
 Hole in the Wall, a nickname of New Hall Inn, Bowness on Windermere, England
 Hole-in-the-wall, a site of the lighthouse in Abaco Islands

Entertainment

Music
 "Hole in the Wall", a 1965 song by The Packers, which peaked at #45 on the Hot 100. 
 Hole in the Wall (band), a Norwegian country-rock band
"Hole in the Wall", a song by Béla Fleck and the Flecktones from the 1991 album Flight of the Cosmic Hippo
 "Hole in the Wall", a song by KMFDM, on the album Angst

Film
 The Hole in the Wall (1921 film), a 1921 American silent film 
 The Hole in the Wall (1929 film), a 1929 American film
 A Hole in the Wall (1930 film), a 1930 French film
 A Hole in the Wall (1950 film), a 1950 French comedy film
 A Hole in the Wall (1982 film), a 1982 Argentine film
 Hole in the Wall (2016 film), a 2016 South African film
 Hole in the Wall, an award-winning short film, produced by Vickie Gest

Television
 Hole in the Wall, a common name for Brain Wall, a component of the Japanese game show series Minasan no Okage desita
 Hole in the Wall (Australian game show), the Australian version
 Hole in the Wall (UK game show), the United Kingdom version
 Hole in the Wall (U.S. game show), the United States version
 Hole in the Wall (Philippine game show), the Philippine version
 Hole in the Wall (Polish game show)
 Hole in the Wall (Vietnam game show)
 "Hole in the Wall" (Justified), a 2013 episode of Justified

Theatre

 The Hole in the Wall Theatre, a former theatre in Perth, Western Australia

Other
 "Hole in the Wall", the name of a 1999 educational experiment, and subsequent educational initiative, associated with the minimally invasive education methodology
 SeriousFun Children's Network, formerly known as The Association of Hole In The Wall Camps

See also
 Hole in the Wall Gang (disambiguation)